Amar Kaushik is an Indian director and actor working in Hindi cinema. He is best known for directing the critical and commercial blockbusters Stree (2018) and Bala (2019).

Early life
Amar Kaushik grew up in Medo, Arunachal Pradesh  where his father was a forest ranger who worked for the Indian Forest Service and his mother Shashi was a school teacher. When he was 10 years old, the family moved to Kanpur, Uttar Pradesh. He later studied mass communications in Delhi and moved to Mumbai in 2006. In 2009, Kaushik was attacked on a bus by Maharashtra Navnirman Sena members who mistakenly believed he was director Anurag Kashyap. MNS leader Raj Thackeray had criticised Kashyap for calling his film Bombay Velvet and had unsuccessfully demanded that he change the name to Mumbai Velvet.

Career
Kaushik began his film career in 2008, working as Raj Kumar Gupta's assistant director on Aamir. He teamed up with Gupta again to serve as associate director for No One Killed Jessica and Ghanchakkar. In addition to crew duties, Kaushik had small acting roles in each of the three films. After working as an associate director on the Onir films Sorry Bhai!, I Am and Shab, Kaushik ventured into solo directing with his short film "Aaaba". The script was written by Kauhsik and based on a story by his mother. It was funded with loans from his friends, including Raj Kumar Gupta. Shot entirely in Ziro, Arunachal Pradesh, "Aaba" was screened at the Toronto International Film Festival and won the Special Jury Prize for Best Short Film at the 2017 Berlin International Film Festival. 

Kaushik began shooting his feature film Stree in January 2018. Starring Rajkummar Rao and Shraddha Kapoor, the horror film released on 31 August 2018. Stree became a surprise hit, earning 125.57 crore by 1 October. Kaushik's upcoming projects include an untitled film on the subject of surrogacy and the sequel to Stree, Stree 2.
Most Notable and commercial successful movie of Kaushik is 2019 movie"Bala" starring Ayushman, Bhumi & Yami.

Filmography

With Major Credits

As Assistant Director

Awards and nominations

References

Living people
Indian film directors
People from Arunachal Pradesh
Year of birth missing (living people)
Filmfare Awards winners